Joseph Love may refer to:

 Joseph Clayton Love (died 1925), Irish politician
 Joseph Robert Love (1839–1914), Bahamian-born doctor, journalist and politician in Jamaica